Mini-Tuesday was the name given to the February 3, 2004 U.S. presidential primary where several states, which to that point had participated in "Super Tuesday," cast their votes for the Presidential nominees of the 2004 Presidential election.  Mini-Tuesday was also called Super Tuesday I (with the March Super Tuesday called Super Tuesday II, in reference to their respective chronological order).  With the large number of states moving their election dates up to Mini-Tuesday for the 2008 election cycle, pundits have largely shied away from using the term again, instead choosing to reappropriate the term "Super Tuesday" to better represent the primaries held on that approximate date. The date is also known as "Super Duper Tuesday," "Giga Tuesday," and "Tsunami Tuesday," among others, with the term "Mini Tuesday" falling to apparent disuse for the time being.

In 2004, U.S. presidential primary elections occurred in Missouri, South Carolina, Arizona, Oklahoma and Delaware.  Presidential caucuses were held in New Mexico and North Dakota.  The Republican primaries and caucuses were virtually uncontested as incumbent President George W. Bush faced no substantial opposition.  The Democratic primaries and caucuses were contested between retired General Wesley Clark of Arkansas, former Governor Howard Dean of Vermont, Senator John Edwards of North Carolina, Senator John Kerry of Massachusetts, Congressman Dennis Kucinich of Ohio, Senator Joseph Lieberman of Connecticut, and the Reverend Al Sharpton of New York.

2004 Results

Missouri

Kerry handily won the biggest prize of the day by securing 51% of the vote in Missouri.  Edwards placed second with 25%.  All other candidates were in the single digits.

Democratic Results:

Republican Results:

Libertarian Results:

Source: Missouri Department of State

South Carolina
In a major victory, Edwards took his birth state of South Carolina, garnering 45% of the vote to Kerry's 30%.

Democratic Results:

Republican Results:

On January 19, 2003, the Republican National Convention announced that the South Carolina Republican Party had passed a resolution granting George W. Bush South Carolina's 46 delegates.

Source: The Green Papers

Arizona
Kerry made a strong showing in Arizona by winning the support of 43% of voters. Clark placed second with 27%. Arizona was the only state primary in which Dean acquired any delegates. His 14% share of the vote netted him just one delegate.

Democratic Results:

Republican Results:

On March 12, 2003 - A state Senate committee in Arizona backed a Republican measure to save $3 million by forgoing that state's primary.  District and county conventions will be held in April.

Sources: Arizona Department of State, The Green Papers

Oklahoma
Oklahoma was the most hotly contested state of Mini-Tuesday 2004.  Clark needed it to stay in the race, while Edwards wanted it so that he could walk away with two victories.  In the end, both candidates got 30% of the vote, with Clark slightly ahead of Edwards.  Kerry also placed strongly with 27%.

Democratic Results:

Republican Results:

Source: Oklahoma Department of State

Delaware
Lieberman took second place in Delaware with 11% of the vote.  However, as this was insufficient to gain him any delegates, he dropped out of the race after a bad showing in the other primaries.  Kerry carried the state with 50% of the vote and all thirteen delegates.

Democratic Results:

Republican Results:

Regional meetings in April will choose delegates for a State Convention in mid-May.

Source: The Green Papers

Caucuses
In both New Mexico and North Dakota, Kerry placed first by a wide margin and Clark came in second to score a small number of delegates.  Additionally, Dean achieved moderate success in New Mexico by netting 18% of the vote and three delegates.

Democratic Results:

New Mexico

North Dakota

Republican Results:

George W. Bush won all 26 of North Dakota's Delegates to the Republican National Convention in the Republican Presidential Preference Caucus.

See also 
 Super Tuesday
 Super Tuesday (2008)

References 

2004 United States presidential primaries